Arnaud Vincent (born 30 November 1974) is a French former Grand Prix motorcycle road racer. He was the 2002 F.I.M. 125cc world champion.

Career statistics

Grand Prix motorcycle racing

Races by year
(key) (Races in bold indicate pole position, races in italics indicate fastest lap)

Supersport World Championship

Races by year
(key)

References 

1974 births
Living people
Sportspeople from Meurthe-et-Moselle
French motorcycle racers
250cc World Championship riders
125cc World Championship riders
Supersport World Championship riders
125cc World Riders' Champions